"You Bring Me Up" is a song recorded by American R&B duo K-Ci & JoJo. The track was written by Big Yam, Victor Merrit, Joel Hailey, and Cedric Hailey for K-Ci & JoJo's debut album, Love Always (1997).

Charts

References 

1997 singles
1997 songs
K-Ci & JoJo songs
E-40 songs
MCA Records singles
Songs written by K-Ci